Qasr-e Sasan (also Romanized as Qaşr-e Sāsān) is a village in Sarvestan Rural District, in the Central District of Sarvestan County, Fars Province, Iran. At the 2006 census, its population was 20, in 5 families.

References 

Populated places in Sarvestan County